Simplified Chinese characters are standardized Chinese characters used in mainland China, Malaysia, Singapore, and international organizations such as the United Nations and the World Bank, as prescribed by the Table of General Standard Chinese Characters. Along with traditional Chinese characters, they are one of the two standard character sets of the contemporary Chinese written language. The government of the People's Republic of China in mainland China has promoted them for use in printing since the 1950s and 1960s to encourage literacy. They are officially used in the People's Republic of China, Malaysia and Singapore, while traditional Chinese characters still remain in common use in Hong Kong, Macau, ROC/Taiwan and Japan to a certain extent.

Simplified Chinese characters may be referred to by their official name  or colloquially . In its broadest sense, the latter term refers to all characters that have undergone simplifications of character "structure" or "body", some of which have existed for millennia mainly in handwriting alongside traditional characters. On the other hand, the official name refers to the modern systematically simplified character set, which includes not only structural simplification but also substantial reduction in the total number of standardized Chinese characters.

Simplified character forms were created by reducing the number of strokes and simplifying the forms of a sizable proportion of Chinese characters. Some simplifications were based on popular cursive forms embodying graphic or phonetic simplifications of the traditional forms. Some characters were simplified by applying regular rules, for example, by replacing all occurrences of a certain component with a simplified version of the component. Variant characters with the same pronunciation and identical meaning were reduced to a single standardized character, usually the simplest amongst all variants in form. Finally, many characters were left untouched by simplification and are thus identical between the traditional and simplified Chinese orthographies.

A second round of simplifications was promulgated in 1977, but was later retracted in 1986 for a variety of reasons, largely due to the confusion caused and the unpopularity of the second-round simplifications.

In August 2009, China began collecting public comments for a modified list of simplified characters. The new Table of General Standard Chinese Characters consisting of 8,105 (simplified and unchanged) characters was officially implemented for use by the State Council of the People's Republic of China on June 5, 2013.

History

China

Before 1949
Although most simplified Chinese characters in use today are the result of the work moderated by the government of the People's Republic of China (PRC) in the 1950s and 1960s, the use of some of these forms predates the PRC's formation in 1949. Caoshu, cursive written text, was the inspiration of some simplified characters, and for others, some are attested as early as the Qin dynasty (221–206 BC) as either vulgar variants or original characters.

One of the earliest proponents of character simplification was Lufei Kui, who proposed in 1909 that simplified characters should be used in education. In the years following the May Fourth Movement in 1919, many anti-imperialist Chinese intellectuals sought ways to modernise China as quickly as possible. Traditional culture and values such as Confucianism were challenged and subsequently blamed for their problems. Soon, people in the movement started to cite the traditional Chinese writing system as an obstacle in modernising China and therefore proposed that a reform be initiated. It was suggested that the Chinese writing system should be either simplified or completely abolished. Lu Xun, a renowned Chinese author in the 20th century, stated that, "If Chinese characters are not destroyed, then China will die". Recent commentators have claimed that Chinese characters were blamed for the economic problems in China during that time.

In the 1930s and 1940s, discussions on character simplification took place within the Kuomintang government, and a large number of the intelligentsia maintained that character simplification would help boost literacy in China. In 1935, 324 simplified characters collected by Qian Xuantong were officially introduced as the table of first batch of simplified characters, but they were suspended in 1936 due to fierce opposition within the party.

After 1949
Within the PRC, further character simplification became associated with the leftists of the Cultural Revolution, culminating with the second-round simplified characters, which were promulgated in 1977. In part due to the shock and unease felt in the wake of the Cultural Revolution and Mao's death, the second round of simplifications was poorly received. In 1986, the authorities retracted the second round completely. In 1965, the PRC published the Yinshua tongyong hanzi zixing biao  (zh) (List of commonly used characters for printing), which included the standardized printing forms of 6196 characters.

There had been simplification initiatives aimed at eradicating characters entirely and establishing the Hanyu Pinyin romanization as the official written system of the PRC, but the reform never gained quite as much popularity as the leftists had hoped. After the retraction of the second round of simplification, the PRC stated that it wished to keep Chinese orthography stable. Years later in 2009, the Chinese government released a major revision list which included 8,300 characters. No new simplifications were introduced. However, six characters previously listed as "traditional" characters that have been simplified, as well as 51 other "variant" characters, were restored to the standard list. In addition, orthographies (e.g., stroke shape) for 44 characters were proposed to be modified slightly to fit traditional calligraphic rules. Also, the practice of unrestricted simplification of rare and archaic characters by analogy using simplified radicals or components is now discouraged. A State Language Commission official cited "oversimplification" as the reason for restoring some characters. The language authority declared an open comment period until August 31, 2009, for feedback from the public. The proposed orthographic changes to 44 characters were not implemented due to overwhelmingly negative public opinion.

The officially promulgated version of the Table of General Standard Chinese Characters, announced in 2013, contained 45 newly recognized standard characters that were previously considered variant forms, as well as official approval of 226 characters that had been simplified by analogy and had seen wide use but were not explicitly given in previous lists or documents.

Singapore and Malaysia

Singapore underwent three successive rounds of character simplification, eventually arriving at the same set of simplified characters as mainland China.

The first round, consisting of 498 simplified characters from 502 traditional characters, was promulgated by the Ministry of Education in 1969. The second round, consisting of 2287 simplified characters, was promulgated in 1974. The second set contained 49 differences from the mainland China system; those were removed in the final round in 1976. In 1993, Singapore adopted the six revisions made by mainland China in 1986. However, unlike in mainland China where personal names may only be registered using simplified characters, parents have the option of registering their children's names in traditional characters in Singapore.

Malaysia promulgated a set of simplified characters in 1981, which were also completely identical to the simplified characters used in mainland China. Chinese-language schools use these.

Traditional characters are still often seen on shop signs, calligraphy, and some newspapers in both countries.

Hong Kong
A small group called Dou Zi Sei or Dou Zi Wui attempted to introduce a special version of simplified characters using romanizations in the 1930s. Today, however, traditional characters remain dominant in Hong Kong.

Japan

After World War II, Japan also simplified a number of Chinese characters (kanji) used in the Japanese language. The new forms are called shinjitai. Compared to Chinese, the Japanese reform was more limited, simplifying only a few hundred characters. Further, the list of simplifications was exhaustive, unlike Chinese simplification – thus analogous simplifications of not explicitly simplified characters (extended shinjitai) are not approved, and instead standard practice is to use the traditional forms.

The number of characters in circulation was also reduced, and formal lists of characters to be learned during each grade of school were established. The overall effect was to standardize teaching and the use of kanji in modern literature and media.

Method of simplification
Structural simplification of characters
All characters simplified this way are enumerated in Chart 1 and Chart 2 in Jianhuazi zong biao, "Complete List of Simplified Characters" announced in 1986.
 Chart 1 lists all 350 characters that are used by themselves, and can never serve as 'simplified character components'.
 Chart 2 lists 132 characters that are used by themselves as well as utilized as simplified character components to further derive other simplified characters. Chart 2 also lists 14 'components' or 'radicals' that cannot be used by themselves, but can be generalized for derivation of more complex characters.
Derivation based on simplified character components
 Chart 3 lists 1,753 characters which are simplified based on the same simplification principles used for character components and radicals in Chart 2. This list is non-exhaustive, so if a character is not already found in Chart 1, 2 or 3, but can be simplified in accordance with Chart 2, the character should be simplified.
Elimination of variants of the same character
 Series One Organization List of Variant Characters accounts for some of the orthography difference between mainland China on the one hand, and Hong Kong and Taiwan on the other. These are not simplifications of character structures, but rather reduction in number of total standard characters. For each set of variant characters that share the identical pronunciation and meaning, one character (usually the simplest in form) is elevated to the standard character set, and the rest are obsoleted. After rounds of revisions, by 1993, some 1,027 variant characters have been declared obsolete by this list. Amongst the chosen variants, those that appear in the "Complete List of Simplified Characters" are also simplified in character structure accordingly.
Adoption of new standardized character forms
 New standardized character forms originated from the "List of character forms of General Used Chinese characters for Publishing" containing 6,196 characters, published in 1965. The new forms tend to adopt vulgar variant forms for most of its characters. The List of Commonly Used Characters in Modern Chinese list, published in 1988, contains 7,000 commonly used characters, and replaces the 1965 list. Since the new forms take vulgar variants, many characters now appear slightly simpler compared to old forms, and as such are often mistaken as structurally simplified characters.

Structural simplification of characters 
All characters simplified this way are enumerated in Chart 1 and Chart 2 in the Complete List of Simplified Characters. Characters in both charts are structurally simplified based on similar set of principles. They are separated into two charts to clearly mark those in Chart 2 as 'usable as simplified character components', based on which Chart 3 is derived.

Merging two or more usually homophonous characters:
  → ;  → ;  → ;  → ; etc.

Using printed forms of cursive shapes:
  → ;  → ;  → ;  → ;  → ;  → ;  → ;  → ;  → ;  → ;  → ;  → ;  → ;  → ;  → ; etc.

  → ;  → ;  → ;  → ;  → ;  → ;  → ; etc.

Omitting entire components:
  → ;  → ;  → ;  → ;  → ;  → ;  → ;  → ;  → ;  → 气; etc.

Further morphing a character after omitting some components:
   → ;  → ;  → ;  → ;  → ; etc.

Preserving the basic outline or shape of the original character
  → ;  → ;  → ;  → ;  → ;  → ; etc.

Replacing the phonetic component of phono-semantic compound characters:
  → ;  → ;  → ;  → ;  → ; etc.

Replacing uncommon phonetic component of a character with a more common one:
  → ;  → ;  → ;  → ; etc.

Replacing entire character with a newly coined phono-semantic compound character:
  → ;  → ;  → ;  → ; etc.

Removing radicals from characters
  → ;  → ;  → ;  → ;  → ; etc.

Only retaining radicals from characters
   → ;  → ;  → ;  → ;  → ;  → ; etc.

Adopting obscure ancient forms or variants:
  → ;  → ;  → ;  → ;  → ;  → ;  → ;  → ;  → ; etc.

Adopting ancient vulgar variants:
  → ;  → ;  → ;  → ;  → ; etc.

Re-adopting abandoned phonetic-loan characters:
   → ;  → ;  → ; etc.

Modifying a traditional character to simplify another traditional character:
   → ;  → ;  → ;  →  etc.

Derivation based on simplified character components
Based on 132 characters and 14 components listed in Chart 2 of the Complete List of Simplified Characters, the 1,753 'derived' characters found in the non-exhaustive Chart 3 can be created by systematically simplifying components using Chart 2 as a conversion table. While exercising such derivation, following rules should be observed:

 The "Complete List of Simplified Characters" employs character components, not the traditional definition of radicals. A component refers to any conceivable part of a character, regardless of its position within the character, or its relative size compared to other components in the same character.
 Each of the 132 simplified characters in Chart 2, when used as a component in compound characters, systematically simplify compound characters in exactly the same way the Chart 2 character itself was simplified. Based on the same principle, these derivations can be made:  → ;  → ;  → ; etc.
 The 14 simplified components in Chart 2 are never used alone as individual characters. They only serve as components.
 Chart 1 collects 352 simplified characters that generally cannot be used as components. Even in rare cases where a Chart 1 character is found as a component in a compound character, the compound character cannot be simplified in the same way.
 A character that is already explicitly listed as simplified character in the "Complete List of Simplified Characters" cannot be alternatively simplified based on derivation.

Sample Derivations:
  → , thus  → ;  → ;  → ; etc.
  → , thus  → ;  → ;  → ; etc.
  → , thus  → ;  → ;  → ;  → ; etc.
  → , thus  → ;  → ;  → ; etc.
  → , thus  → ;  → ;  → ;  → ; etc.
  → , thus  → ;  → ;  → ; etc.

Elimination of variants of the same character
The "Series One Organization List of Variant Characters" reduces the number of total standard characters. First, amongst each set of variant characters sharing identical pronunciation and meaning, one character (usually the simplest in form) is elevated to the standard character set, and the rest are made obsolete. Then amongst the chosen variants, those that appear in the "Complete List of Simplified Characters" are also simplified in character structure accordingly. Some examples follow:

Sample reduction of equivalent variants:
  → ;  → ;  → ;  → ;  → ;  →  etc.

In choosing standard characters, often ancient variants with simple structures are preferred:
  → ;  → ;  → ; etc.

Vulgar forms simpler in structure are also chosen:
  → ;  → ;  → ;  → ; etc.

The chosen variant was already simplified in Chart 1:
  →  → ;  →  → ;  →  → ;  →  → ;  →  → ;  →  → ; etc.

In some instances, the chosen variant is actually more complex than eliminated ones. An example is the character  which is eliminated in favor of the variant form . Note that the "hand" radical , with three strokes, on the left of the eliminated  is now "seen" as more complex, appearing as the "tree" radical , with four strokes, in the chosen variant .

Not all characters standardised in the simplified set consist of fewer strokes. Such characters do not constitute simplified characters.

Adoption of new standardized character forms

The new standardized character forms shown in the List of Character Forms of Generally Used Chinese Characters for Publishing and revised through the List of Commonly Used Characters in Modern Chinese tend to adopt vulgar variant character forms. Since the new forms take vulgar variants, many characters now appear slightly simpler compared to old forms, and as such are often mistaken as structurally simplified characters. Some examples follow:

The traditional component  becomes :
  → ;  → ; etc.

The traditional component  becomes :
  → ;  → ; etc.

The traditional "Break" stroke becomes the "Dot" stroke:
  → ;  → ; etc.

The traditional components  and  become :
  → ;  → ; etc.

The traditional component  becomes :
  → ;  → ; etc.

Inconsistencies
A commonly cited example of the irregularity of simplification involves characters that share the "hand" component  , which is used in many simplified characters. This is due to the fact that in the Complete List of Simplified Characters,  →  appears in Chart 1 while  →  is listed in Chart 2 and  →  as a derived character in the non-exhaustive list in Chart 3. Therefore,  is defined as a 'simplified character component' according to the standard, while  is not. Since both  →  and  →  appear in Chart 1, they are not defined as derived characters. Further investigation reveals that these two characters do not appear in Chart 1 nor in "Series One Organization List of Variant Characters". Thus they remain unchanged from traditional forms in the "List of Commonly Used Characters in Modern Chinese".

Distribution and use

The People's Republic of China and Singapore generally use simplified characters. They appear very sparingly in printed text produced in Hong Kong, Macau, Taiwan, and overseas Chinese communities, although they are becoming more prevalent as China opens to the world. Conversely, the mainland is seeing an increase in the use of traditional forms, where they are often used on signs, and in logos, blogs, dictionaries, and scholarly works.

Mainland China
The Law of the People's Republic of China on the National Common Language and Characters implies simplified Chinese as the standard script, with traditional Chinese being used for purposes such as ceremonies, cultural purposes (e.g. calligraphy), decoration, publications and books on ancient literature and poetry, and research purposes. Traditional Chinese remains ubiquitous on buildings predating the promotion of simplified characters, such as former government buildings, religious buildings, educational institutions, and historical monuments. Traditional Chinese is also often used for commercial purposes, such as shopfront displays and advertisements.

As part of the one country, two systems model, the PRC has not attempted to force Hong Kong or Macau into using simplified characters. The PRC tends to print material intended for people in Hong Kong, Macau and Taiwan, and overseas Chinese in traditional characters. For example, it prints versions of the People's Daily in traditional characters and both the People's Daily and Xinhua websites have versions in traditional characters using Big5 encoding. Mainland companies selling products in Hong Kong, Macau and Taiwan use traditional characters on their displays and packaging to communicate with consumers (the reverse is true as well).

Dictionaries published in mainland China generally show both simplified and their traditional counterparts. In digital media, many cultural phenomena imported from Hong Kong and Taiwan into mainland China, such as music videos, karaoke videos, subtitled movies, and subtitled dramas, use traditional Chinese characters.

Hong Kong
Textbooks, official statements, newspapers, including the PRC-funded media, show no signs of moving to simplified Chinese characters. However, some students may opt to use the simplified form when taking notes or doing test papers to write faster.

It is common for Hong Kong people to learn traditional Chinese characters in school, and some simplified Chinese in passing (either through reading mainland-published books or other media). For use on computers, however, people tend to type Chinese characters using a traditional character set such as Big5. In Hong Kong, as well as elsewhere, it is common for people who use both sets to do so because it is much easier to convert from the traditional character set to the simplified character set because of the usage of the aforementioned methods 8 and 9 of simplification.

Taiwan
Simplified Chinese characters are not officially used in governmental and civil publications in Taiwan. However, it is legal to import simplified character publications and distribute them. Certain simplified characters that have long existed in informal writing for centuries also have popular usage, while those characters simplified originally by the Taiwanese government are much less common in daily appearance.

In all areas, most handwritten text will include informal simplifications (alternative script) which are not the same as the simplifications officially promulgated by the PRC and are often instead influenced by the shinjitai used in Japan. This is because the adoption of simplified characters has been gradual and predates the Chinese Civil War by several decades and some are used beyond mainland China to some extent.

Singapore and Malaysia
In Singapore, where Mandarin Chinese is one of the official languages, simplified characters are the official standard and are generally used in all official publications as well as the government-controlled press. While simplified characters are taught exclusively in schools and are generally used in all official publications, the government does not officially discourage the use of traditional characters and still allow parents to choose whether to have their child's Chinese name registered in simplified or traditional characters. Furthermore, traditional characters are widely used by older generations and are widespread on signboards, stall menus, and decorations, among others.

In Malaysia, Chinese is not an official language, but over 90% of ethnic-Chinese students are educated in Chinese schools, which have taught simplified characters since 1981. Likewise, traditional characters are also widely used by older generations and are widespread on signboards, etc., albeit more common than in Singapore. Most of Malaysia's Chinese newspapers compromise by retaining traditional characters in article headlines but using simplified characters for content.

As there is no restriction of the use of traditional characters in the mass media, television programmes, books, magazines and music CD's that have been imported from Hong Kong or Taiwan are widely available, and these almost always use traditional characters. Most karaoke discs, being imported from Hong Kong or Taiwan, have song lyrics in traditional characters as well. Many shop signs continue to be written in traditional characters. Menus in hawker centres and coffee shops are also commonly seen in traditional characters.

Education
In general, schools in mainland China, Malaysia and Singapore use simplified characters exclusively, while schools in Hong Kong, Macau, and Taiwan use traditional characters exclusively.

Today, simplified Chinese characters predominate among college and university programs teaching Chinese as a foreign language outside of China, such as those in the United States.

Mainland China
In December 2004, Ministry of Education authorities rejected a proposal from a Beijing Chinese People's Political Consultative Conference (CPPCC) political conference member that called for elementary schools to teach traditional Chinese characters in addition to the simplified ones. The conference member pointed out that many, especially young people, have difficulties with traditional Chinese characters; this is especially important in dealing with non-mainland communities such as Taiwan and Hong Kong. The educational authorities did not approve the recommendation, saying that it did not fit in with the "requirements as set out by the law" and it could potentially complicate the curricula. A similar proposal was delivered to the first plenary session of the 11th CPPCC in March 2008.

Hong Kong
Most, if not all, Chinese language textbooks in Hong Kong are written in traditional characters. Before 1997, the use of simplified characters was generally discouraged by educators. After 1997, while students are still expected to be proficient and utilize traditional characters in formal settings, they may sometimes adopt a hybrid written form in informal settings to speed up writing. With the exception of open examinations, simplified Chinese characters are considered acceptable by the Hong Kong Examinations and Assessment Authority for their speed.

Singapore and Malaysia
Chinese textbooks in Singapore and Malaysia are written exclusively in simplified characters, and only simplified characters are taught in school. Traditional characters are usually only taught to those taking up calligraphy as a co-curricular activity or Cantonese as an elective course at school.

Chinese as a foreign language

As the source of many Mandarin Chinese textbooks is mainland China, the majority of textbooks teaching Chinese are now based on simplified characters and Hanyu Pinyin – although there are textbooks originating in China which have a traditional version. For practical reasons, universities and schools prepare students who will be able to communicate with mainland China, so their obvious choice is to use simplified characters.

In places where a particular set is not locally entrenched, such as Europe and the United States, instruction is now mostly simplified, as the economic importance of mainland China increases, and also because of the availability of textbooks printed in mainland China. Teachers of international students often recommend learning both systems.

Europe
In the United Kingdom, universities mainly teach Mandarin Chinese at the undergraduate level using the simplified characters coupled with pinyin. However, they will require the students to learn or be able to recognise the traditional forms if they are studying in Taiwan or Hong Kong (such as taking Cantonese courses). In Australia and New Zealand, schools, universities and TAFEs use predominantly simplified characters.

Russia and most East European nations are traditionally oriented on the education of the PRC's system for teaching Chinese, which uses simplified characters but exposes the learners to both systems.

East Asia
In South Korea, universities have used predominantly simplified characters since 1990s. In high school, Chinese is one of the selective subjects. By the regulation of the national curricula standards, MPS I and traditional characters had been originally used before (since the 1940s), but by the change of regulation, pinyin and simplified characters have been used to pupils who enter the school in 1996 or later. Therefore, MPS I and traditional characters disappeared after 1998 in South Korean high school Chinese curriculum.

In Japan there are two types of schools. Simplified Chinese is taught instead of traditional Chinese in pro-mainland China schools. They also teach Pinyin, a romanization system for standard Chinese, while the Taiwan-oriented schools teach Zhuyin, which uses phonetic symbols. However, the Taiwan-oriented schools are starting to teach simplified Chinese and Pinyin to offer a more well-rounded education.

Southeast Asia
In the Philippines, the use of simplified characters has become increasingly popular. Before the 1970s, Chinese schools in the Philippines were under the supervision of the Ministry of Education of the Republic of China. Hence, most books were using traditional characters. Traditional characters remained prevalent until the early 2000s. Institutions like the Confucius Institute, being the cultural arm of the People's Republic of China, are strong proponents of the use of simplified characters. Also, many schools are now importing their Mandarin textbooks from Singapore instead of Taiwan.

Public universities such as the Linguistics and Asian Languages Department of the University of the Philippines use simplified characters in their teaching materials. On the other hand, private schools such as Chiang Kai Shek College and Saint Jude Catholic School remain major proponents of the usage of traditional characters. Some private universities, such as the Ateneo de Manila University, also use simplified characters.

Computer encoding and fonts
In computer text applications, the GB encoding scheme most often renders simplified Chinese characters, while Big5 most often renders traditional characters. Although neither encoding has an explicit connection with a specific character set, the lack of a one-to-one mapping between the simplified and traditional sets established a de facto linkage.

Since simplified Chinese conflated many characters into one and since the initial version of the GB encoding scheme, known as GB 2312-80, contained only one code point for each character, it is impossible to use GB 2312 to map to the bigger set of traditional characters. It is theoretically possible to use Big5 code to map to the smaller set of simplified character glyphs, although there is little market for such a product. Newer and alternative forms of GB have support for traditional characters. In particular, mainland authorities have now established GB 18030 as the official encoding standard for use in all mainland software publications. The encoding contains all East Asian characters included in Unicode 3.0. As such, GB 18030 encoding contains both simplified and traditional characters found in Big-5 and GB, as well as all characters found in Japanese and Korean encodings.

Unicode deals with the issue of simplified and traditional characters as part of the project of Han unification by including code points for each. This was rendered necessary by the fact that the linkage between simplified characters and traditional characters is not one-to-one. While this means that a Unicode system can display both simplified and traditional characters, it also means that different localization files are needed for each type.

The Chinese characters used in modern Japanese (called Kanji characters) have also undergone simplification, but generally to a lesser extent than with simplified Chinese. It is worth mentioning that Japan's writing system utilizes a reduced number of Chinese characters in daily use, resulting partly from the Japanese language reforms; thus, a number of complex characters are written phonetically. Reconciling these different character sets in Unicode became part of the controversial process of Han unification. Not surprisingly, some of the Chinese characters used in Japan are neither 'traditional' nor 'simplified'. In this case, these characters cannot be found in traditional/simplified Chinese dictionaries.

In font filenames and descriptions, the acronym SC is used to signify the use of simplified Chinese characters to differentiate fonts that use TC for traditional Chinese characters.

Web pages
The World Wide Web Consortium's Internationalization working group recommends the use of the language tag  as a language attribute value and Content-Language value to specify web-page content in simplified Chinese characters.

Criticism

There are ongoing disputes among users of Chinese characters related to the introduction of simplified Chinese characters.

Author Liu Shahe was an outspoken critic of the simplification of Chinese characters. He wrote a dedicated column entitled "Simplified Characters are Unreasonable" (简化字不讲理) in the Chinese edition of the Financial Times.

Traditional Chinese supporters sometimes refer to simplified Chinese as 殘體字 ( – 'crippled characters').

Criticism of the simplifications does not necessarily imply sympathy for restoration of the traditional spelling since alternative simplifications are possible.

See also

 Ambiguities in Chinese character simplification
 Chinese Character Simplification Scheme
 Debate on traditional and simplified Chinese characters
 Ryakuji
 Xin Zixing
 Shinjitai ( or  – Japanese simplified characters)
 Differences between Shinjitai and Simplified characters 
 Traditional Chinese characters

Notes

References

Further reading

External links
 Andrew West, Proposal to Encode Obsolete Simplified Chinese Characters
 Stroke Order Animation and Dictionary of Simplified Chinese Characters
 Simplified to Traditional Chinese Conversion Table

 
Chinese language
Chinese